Alane may refer to:

Aluminium hydride, a chemical reagent used as a reducing agent
"Alane" (song), a 1997 song recorded by Wes Madiko

People with the surname
Annick Alane (born 1925), French actress
Bernard Alane (born 1948), French actor